Pristacrus is a genus of beetles in the family Carabidae, containing the following species:

 Pristacrus binotatus (Klug, 1833)
 Pristacrus laticollis (Gory & Laporte de Castelnau, 1837)
 Pristacrus rotundatus (Fairmaire, 1892)
 Pristacrus semipiceus (Fairmaire, 1888)

References

Lebiinae